Fairbanks station may refer to:

Fairbanks Street station, a light rail stop in Massachusetts, United States
Fairbanks Depot, a railway station in Alaska, United States
Fairbank station, a light rail station in Ontario, Canada